Brevoort Island is a small, uninhabited island located in the Labrador Sea off the eastern coast of Baffin Island in the Qikiqtaaluk Region of northern Canada's territory of Nunavut. The island is a member of the Arctic Archipelago and lies north of Cape Murchison, opposite the Cumberland Peninsula.

Geography
It has a hilly interior, mostly composed of granite.

Military use
The island is the home of BAF-3, a Distant Early Warning Line and now a North Warning System site. It has a non-radar, rearward communications (relay) station.

References

External links 
 Satellite image
 Photo RES-X-1, May 1957

Islands of Baffin Island
Uninhabited islands of Qikiqtaaluk Region
Islands of the Labrador Sea
Former populated places in the Qikiqtaaluk Region